Batman/Daredevil: King of New York is a crossover graphic novel published by Marvel Comics and DC Comics in 2000, written by Alan Grant, with art by Eduardo Barreto. It was a sequel to Daredevil/Batman: Eye for an Eye.

Plot 

In the story, Daredevil and Batman must work together to defeat Ra's al Ghul and the Kingpin (with a brief appearance by the Scarecrow in the beginning of the story) as they team up to disperse fear gas over Gotham City.

References 

2000 comics debuts
Batman titles
Comics by Alan Grant (writer)
Comics set in New York City
Elseworlds titles
Daredevil (Marvel Comics) titles